More Malice is the reissue of American recording artist Snoop Dogg's tenth studio album Malice n Wonderland (2009). All the songs from the album are on the re-release with five new tracks, four remixes, one song included on Malice n Wonderland and a movie, which stars Jamie Foxx, Xzibit, Denyce Lawton and DJ Quik, among others, which was simultaneously released with the album on March 23, 2010. The first single of the album is the remix of the original album's third single, "I Wanna Rock", known as "I Wanna Rock (The Kings G-Mix)", which features fellow American rapper Jay-Z. A new song titled "That Tree", featuring fellow American rapper Kid Cudi, was released in February 2010. Snoop Dogg also added the remix of "Pronto", which features Soulja Boy Tell 'Em and Bun B.

Commercial performance 
The re-release charted at number 29 on the US Billboard 200, selling 15,400 copies in the first week.

Track listing 

 (add.) Additional production
 (co.) Co-producer

Sample credits
 "I Wanna Rock (The Kings G-Mix)" contains a sample of "It Takes Two" as performed by Rob Base and DJ E-Z Rock, "Microphone Fiend" as performed by Eric B. & Rakim and "Think About It" as performed by Lyn Collins.
 "You're Gonna Love Me" contains a sample of "I Gave To You" as performed by The Delfonics.
"That Tree" contains a sample of "Hey Gidî" Kurdish folk song as performed by Ibrahim Tatlises in 1989.

Personnel 
Credits adapted from Allmusic.

 Lucky Alvarez - design, layout
 B-Don - producer
 Mike Bozzi - assistant
 Aaron "A-Game" Brunson - keyboard
 Bun B - vocals
 Butch Cassidy - vocals
 Dae One - producer
 Makayla Davis - background - vocals
 Dee Dimes - background vocals
 Scoop DeVille - producer
 Paul Devro - additional producer
 Diplo - mixing, producer
 Dr. Dre - mixing
 Shon Don - engineer
 The-Dream - vocals, producer
 Brian Gardner - mastering
 Martin Gee - photography
 Drumma Boy - producer
 Donovan Gold - photography
 Todd Harris - artwork
 Tasha Hayward - hair stylist
 Dustin Hess - bass
 Richard Huredia - mixing, remixing
 Mauricio Iragorri - mixing
 Holli Joyce Ivory - background vocals
 Jaycen Joshua - mixing
 Jay-Z - vocals
 Young Guru - engineer
 Justin Keitt - background vocals

 Kid Cudi - vocals
 Cha'nelle Lewis - background vocals
 Kori Lewis - assistant
 Justin Li - A&R
 Giancarlo Lino - mixing assistant
 Mac Lucci - vocals
 Deborah Mannis-Gardner - sample clearance
 Ryan McNeely - logo
 Marq Moody - engineer
 Luis Navarro - assistant engineer
 Jesse Novak - assistant engineer
 Estevan Oriol - photographer
 Robert Reyes - assistant engineer
 April Roomet - wardrobe
 Marcus Rutledge - engineer
 Sakke - producer
 Snoop Dogg - arranger, executive producer, primary artist
 Soulja Boy - vocals
 Miguel Starcevich - photography
 Tricky Stewart - producer
 T'yana Shani Stewart - background vocals
 Ethan Sugar - engineer
 Paul Sun - photography
 Super Ced - drum programming, producer
 Brian "B-Luv" Thomas - engineer
 Pat Thrall - engineer
 Frank Vasquez - engineer
 Andrew Wuepper - engineer
 Damizza - engineer

Charts

Weekly charts

Year-end charts

References

2010 EPs
Snoop Dogg albums
Albums produced by Battlecat (producer)
Albums produced by Diplo
Albums produced by Drumma Boy
Albums produced by Nottz
Albums produced by Scoop DeVille
Albums produced by Tricky Stewart
Albums produced by The-Dream
Priority Records EPs
Doggystyle Records albums
Reissue albums